Connect is a public art work by artist Jeremy Wolf. It is installed in Riverside Park on the east side of Milwaukee, Wisconsin.

Description
Connect is an anthropomorphic bronze sculpture depicting a life-sized raccoon holding a fish with its two hands. One of its back feet is raised. While the animal's fur, tail and head closely mimic a raccoon's actual features, its feet, forearms and hands have a human quality. The base on which the raccoon sits is embossed with woodland imagery like trees, insects and a salamander.

Commission process
Connect was selected by a committee assembled by the Urban Ecology Center.  Four artists—Susan Falkman, Peter Flanary, Richard Taylor and Jeremy Wolf—presented their concepts and fielded questions at an open meeting held at Riverside University High School in November 2003.

References

2005 establishments in Wisconsin
2005 sculptures
Animal sculptures in Wisconsin
Bronze sculptures in Wisconsin
Fish in art
Mammals in art
Outdoor sculptures in Milwaukee
Statues in Wisconsin
Insects in art